St Peter's Church is a Church of England parish church in Addingham, West Yorkshire. It is a Grade I listed building, with the main structure dating to a 15th-century rebuild but with some of the earliest parts dating from the Norman period.

History

During the late 15th century, this church was built to replace an earlier church, and Norman fabric has been re-used inside the tower.  The west tower and the wall of the south aisle were rebuilt between 1757 and 1760.  The chancel was restored in 1875.  Most of the church is in Neoclassical style, other than the north aisle, which is Perpendicular.  In the church is the fragment of a Saxon cross.

See also
Grade I listed churches in West Yorkshire
Listed buildings in Addingham

References

Bibliography

External links

 Church website
 A Church Near You entry

Church of England church buildings in West Yorkshire
Grade I listed churches in West Yorkshire
15th-century church buildings in England